Stralendorf is an Amt in the Ludwigslust-Parchim district, in Mecklenburg-Vorpommern, Germany. The seat of the Amt is in Stralendorf.

The Amt Stralendorf consists of the following municipalities:
Dümmer 
Holthusen 
Klein Rogahn 
Pampow 
Schossin 
Stralendorf
Warsow 
Wittenförden 
Zülow

References

Ämter in Mecklenburg-Western Pomerania